Vincenzo Leuzzi (Rome, 1909–1983) was Director of Transport Institute, University of Rome Engineering School.

Prof. Leuzzi's main contributions were in public transport policy at international and national level, especially in electric rails.

Biography 
He completed his Degree in Industrial Engineering at La Sapienza University in 1931. In 1932 he became teaching assistant of prof. Umberto Bajocchi. In the same years, he contributed some projects, as the design of the Rome Metro in 1937, the improvement of the electric power plants of Rome–Lido railway in 1938. He has been teaching "Electric traction" since 1952, and "Economy of Transports" since 1951 at University of Bari and in Rome.
He has been served as Director of Transport Institute of Rome from 1957 to 1977, when he retired.

Leuzzi made contributions of the policy of transports in several countries, as Italy, France, Switzerland, Baltic states, etc.

The Library of the Department of Transport Engineering of La Sapienza University, in the main Faculty building next San Pietro in Vincoli, is entitled to Prof. Vincenzo Leuzzi.

Studies 
Leuzzi V., in "International road safety research directory", Organisation for Economic Co-operation and Development, OECD, 1966.
Leuzzi V.,"Better cities with lesser traffic", proceedings, OECD, 1975. 
Leuzzi V., "I trasporti in Italia" (Transports in Italy), chapter in "Ambiente e informatica: problemi nuovi della società contemporanea - Italy", Italian Parliament, Italian Chamber of Deputies, Secretary for General Affairs, 1974 - with the introduction of Sandro Pertini.
Leuzzi, V. "Braking of Road Vehicles with Tandem Axles Equipped with Equalization." Automobiltechnische Zeitschrift 59.3 (1957): 58-61.
Leuzzi V., in 'L'électrification en courant monophasé 50 Hz de la ligne de Valenciennes à Thionville: et les Journées d'information de Lille. (11-14 mai 1955)', Société nationale des chemins de fer français, SNCF, Dunod, 1955.
Leuzzi V., “The Höllenthal Railway and the Monophase 50 Hz System“, Railway Engineering Abstracts, Institution of Civil Engineers, and The Railway and London Transport Executives, 1955.
Leuzzi V., in "Technisches Zentralblatt. Abteilung Maschinenwesen", Berlin-Brandenburg Academy of Sciences and Humanities, 1951.

Books 
Leuzzi V., Paribeni M., "Power Transmission from Engine to Wheels in Motor-buses", 29.me congrès international de l’Union internationale des transports publics": (monograph) Edimbourg, 1951.
Leuzzi V. - "Fondamenti di Trasporti"– Edizioni Scientifiche Associate (ESA), Roma, 1981 - 340 pagine.  
Leuzzi V. - "Elementi del traffico", a cura dr. ing. Antonio Atticciati - Edito a cura del Sindacato nazionale ingegneri dell'Ispettorato generale MCTC, Roma - Tip. ABeTE, 1960
Leuzzi V. - "I fattori peso, potenza e velocità nell’ esercizio stradale", Milano, Malusardi, 1960 
Leuzzi, V. - "Tecnica ed economia dei trasporti: trazione elettrica, trazione diesel elettrica" - Ed. riv. ed ampliata. - Roma : Edizioni moderne, 1948.
Leuzzi, V. - "Trazione elettrica" - Facoltà di Ingegneria di Roma, Roma - R. Pioda, (1936) (Lit.)

Notes

References
Ricordo di Vincenzo Leuzzi, Ingegneria Ferroviaria, n.10, October 1983, pp. 674-675.

External links 
 Memorial site on Vincenzo Leuzzi

1909 births
1983 deaths
Academic staff of the Sapienza University of Rome
Burials at Campo Verano